Hunter Markus Shepard (born November 7, 1995) is an American professional ice hockey goaltender currently playing with the Hershey Bears in the American Hockey League (AHL) while under contract to the Washington Capitals of the National Hockey League (NHL).

Growing up in Grand Rapids, Minnesota, Shepard attended Grand Rapids High School where he played prep school hockey and baseball. In his senior year, he received a Minnesota Minute Men Mr. Hockey Award and joined the Bismarck Bobcats of the North American Hockey League (NAHL). After two seasons with the Bobcats, during which he won their Goaltender of the Year award, he was approached by the Minnesota-Duluth Bulldogs men's ice hockey (UMD) team to be their third goaltender.

Shepard played four seasons of NCAA Division I collegiate hockey with the Bulldogs, setting various records as the team's co-captain. He became the first goaltender captain since Rick Heinz in 1976 and received the 2018 Keith Christiansen Award as UMD's Most Valuable Player. Shepard started in over 105 consecutive games for the Bulldogs, setting a new NCAA record, and became the first netminder in a half century to lead his club to two consecutive NCAA titles. As a result of his achievements, he was selected as an AHCA All-American twice, received the NCHC Goaltender of the Year Award twice, was named NCHC Tournament MVP and a finalist for the Mike Richter Award.

Early life
Shepard was born in Grand Rapids, Minnesota to parents Mark and Terri Shepard on November 7, 1995. Growing up, he was placed in a daycare run by the mother of Adam Hauser, the University of Minnesota's Golden Gophers men's ice hockey team's starting goaltender. He would use a goaltending glove to catch softballs in the Hausers’ living room and credits Hauser for encouraging him to become a goalie. Since no one in his family played hockey, his father and uncle coached him in baseball. He began playing competitive hockey at the age of five or six.

Playing career

Youth
While attending Grand Rapids High School, Shepard played prep school hockey as a goaltender and baseball as an infielder and pitcher. In his final year at the school, Shepard and teammate Avery Peterson became the first pair from the same school to receive Minnesota Minute Men Mr Hockey awards in the same season. Upon graduating, he remained undrafted into the NHL and was not awarded any scholarships to play collegiate hockey. He had been drafted by the Lincoln Stars in the third round of the Tier 1 United States Hockey League draft but chose not to play with the team for he was not given a goaltending coach. Upon choosing to leave the team, he called head coach Layne Sedevie of the Bismarck Bobcats in the North American Hockey League (NAHL) to see if there was a spot for him on their roster.

Shepard made his debut with the Bobcats during the 2014–15 season, where he let in seven goals on 25 shots including three on his first four shots. At the end of his first year with the Bobcats, Shepard played in 31 games and yielded a 14-14-1 record, a 3.28 goals-against average (GAA) and a .878 saves percentage. In his second season with the team, Shepard improved to a 34–11–3 record, setting a new franchise record in wins, with a 1.90 GAA and a .926 save percentage. As a result, he was selected to Team Central at the 2016 Top Prospects Tournament where he recorded a 1.99 GAA and named NAHL's January Goaltender of the Month. During the month of January, Shepard led the Bobcats into 1st place in the Central Division by winning all eight games he started while facing 241 shots during the month.  Following his second season with the Bobcats, and his last year of junior hockey eligibility, Shepard was approached by the Minnesota-Duluth Bulldogs men's ice hockey team to be their third goaltender. His signing had been a last-minute move due to sophomore goaltender Kasimir Kaskisuo leaving in May to sign a professional contract. When asked later about what would have happened if Minnesota had not approach him, Shepard said he would have attended a Division III school and played hockey and baseball.

Collegiate
Shepard played for the Minnesota-Duluth Bulldogs at the University of Minnesota Duluth while majoring in marketing. He made his collegiate debut in a 3–1 loss to the Notre Dame Fighting Irish men's ice hockey team on October 15, 2016, where he stopped 35 shots. His save count was the most by a Bulldog goalie in his first collegiate appearance since October 26, 1991. His second appearance occurred on March 3, 2017, as a reliever to starter Hunter Miska in the second period against the Western Michigan Broncos men's ice hockey team. As the team qualified for the 2017 NCAA Division I Men's Ice Hockey Tournament, Shepard dressed for the Bulldogs four NCAA appearances.

Shepard returned to the Bulldogs for his sophomore season where he battled for the starting goaltender position with Ben Patt and Nick Deery following the departure of Miska. Coach Scott Sandelin told each goaltender that they would each have a period to prove themselves during the Bulldogs season opener against the Minnesota Golden Gophers. Shepard played during the second period where he stopped all 10 shots he faced. He started with a shared goaltending position but eventually earned the starter spot and became the first UMD goaltender to post back-to-back shutouts in a home series. The Bulldogs began the 2017–18 season at the bottom of the NCHC standings with a record under .500 but Scott Sandelin later credited Shepard's support for bringing the team up in the standings. As the Bulldogs slowly climbed the standings, Shepard set two new UMD records during a February game against the Western Michigan Broncos. He set a new record for most shutouts by a goaltender in a single season with six and most consecutive shutouts with three. By April, Shepard posted a .924 save percentage and 1.95 goals-against average as the team earned a 2018 Frozen Four tournament qualification against the Ohio State Buckeyes men's ice hockey team. The Bulldogs beat the Buckeyes 2–1 and Shepard was selected to the NCAA Frozen Four All-Tournament Team and named the Most Valuable Player. The Bulldogs then faced Notre Dame in the 2018 National Championship where he made 19 saves in an eventual 2–1 win for their second national title in program history. He ended the season with a 1.91 goals against average and .925 saves percentage with a 25–14–1 record, a new UMD single season record. As a result of his play, Shepard was named a semifinalist for the Mike Richter Award and received the Keith Christiansen Award as UMD's Most Valuable Player.

During the offseason prior to his junior year at Minnesota-Duluth, Shepard was invited to participate at the Minnesota Wild and Buffalo Sabres' development camps. He returned to the Bulldogs for the 2018–19 season unsigned to a professional contract and was named to the six-man Preseason All-NCHC Team. While completing his junior campaign, Shepard posted a 29–11–2 record, ranking first overall in wins and second in shutouts with seven. As a result, he concluded the season having started a program-record 81 consecutive games and earned a spot on the NCAA Frozen Four, the NCAA Midwest Regional and NCHC Frozen Faceoff All-Tournament Teams. He also earned his first NCHC Goaltender of the Year Award and NCHC Three Stars Award. As the Bulldogs entered the postseason, Shepard was named a AHCA First Team All-American, the first UMD goaltender since Alex Stalock, and a final five finalist for the Mike Richter Award. During the 2019 Frozen Four Tournament, Shepard posted his seventh shutout against the UMass Minutemen ice hockey team, setting a nation-leading 29th win record. He then led the team to their second NCAA National Championship title and received his second Keith "Huffer" Christiansen Award as UMD MVP.

Upon winning their second NCAA National Championship title, Shepard immediately told the team he would return for another season. He later said "most people might have thought that (he would go pro), but it was an easy decision for me. I grew up in Minnesota, my family is here, I love my teammates, the coaching staff. And I made a commitment to come here to play for four years. That means something to me." He returned for his senior year where he was subsequently named co-captain of the Bulldogs with Nick Wolff, thus becoming the Bulldog's first goaltender captain since Rick Heinz in 1976. His record breaking continued as on November 27, 2019, he set a new UMD record for most wins by a goaltender with his 61st career win against the Colorado College Tigers men's ice hockey team. On January 25, 2020, Shepard started his 105th consecutive start for the Bulldogs, setting a new NCAA record for most consecutive starts by a goaltender. The following month, Shepard was named one of 20 goaltenders onto the watch list for the 2020 Mike Richter Award. The season was cut short due to the COVID-19 pandemic but Shepard had posted a 22–10–2 record, a 2.18 goals against average, and a .918 saves percentage in 34 games and was selected as an AHCA Second-Team All-American. He also received his second Goaltender of the Year Award and named the University of Minnesota Duluth's Outstanding Male Senior Athlete Award. He left the Bulldogs as one of their most decorated goaltenders in program history.

Professional

Shepard officially concluded his collegiate career on June 25, 2020, by signing a two-year American Hockey League (AHL) contract with the Hershey Bears. In December, Shepard was re-assigned to the South Carolina Stingrays of the ECHL and was named ECHL Goaltender of the Month. He held a 3–4–1 record in nine appearances with the Stingrays before being recalled to the Hershey Bears.

Shepard started with the South Carolina Stingrays during the 2021 ECHL Playoffs, ultimately resulting in the South Carolina Stingrays going to the Kelly Cup Finals against the Fort Wayne Komets. The Komets won game 1 with a score of 7-2 while the Stingrays won game 2 with a score of 4-2. Although the Stingrays subsequently lost the next two games, which resulted in the Komets winning the Kelly Cup, Shepard received the June M. Kelly Playoffs Most Valuable Player Award. On the back of a successful season in the ECHL, Shepard was signed to a two-year, two-way NHL contract with the Bears affiliate, the Washington Capitals, on July 28, 2021.

Career statistics

References

External links
 

1995 births
Living people
AHCA Division I men's ice hockey All-Americans
American ice hockey goaltenders
Hershey Bears players
Minnesota Duluth Bulldogs men's ice hockey players
University of Minnesota Duluth alumni
Sportspeople from Grand Rapids, Minnesota
Ice hockey players from Minnesota
South Carolina Stingrays players